Kate Rutter is an English actress, best known for I, Daniel Blake, Peterloo and River City.

Filmography

Personal life 

Kate Rutter was born and raised in Leeds, Yorkshire, she trained as an actress at Rose Bruford College in Sidcup, Southeast London and began her career in 1977 working on various productions for Yorkshire Playhouse under director Phil Young. Her first television appearance was in 1994 in series Earthfasts by William Mayne. Since then Kate has appeared as a series regular in both ITV's Coronation Street and BBC River City. In 2020, Kate Rutter's appearance on BBC's Question Time sparked controversy over whether the actress was hired by the BBC.

Awards and nominations

References

Living people
Actresses from Leeds
English film actresses
English television actresses
English soap opera actresses
Alumni of Rose Bruford College
Year of birth missing (living people)